Monday Night Live is an American sports-oriented television talk show that aired Mondays 7:00 PM to 8:00 PM ET on Comcast SportsNet Philadelphia live from Chickie's and Pete's Cafe in South Philly. The show was hosted by Michael Barkann, who was joined by Hugh Douglas and Ike Reese for a variety of sports-related entertainment and talk. Kathy Romano joined the show in 2008.  Live musical entertainment was provided by house band The Quake.

Hosts 
 Michael Barkann
 Hugh Douglas
 Ike Reese

References

External links
 

2006 American television series debuts
2010s American television series
Local sports television programming in the United States